Melaleuca teuthidoides is a plant in the myrtle family, Myrtaceae and is endemic to the south of Western Australia. It is a shrub with rough bark and heads of white flowers on the ends of its branches in spring and early summer.

Description

The flowers are white and arranged in heads or spikes on the ends of branches which continue to grow after flowering and sometimes in the upper leaf axils. The stamens are arranged in five bundles around the flowers and there are 12 to 16 stamens per bundle.

Taxonomy and naming
Melaleuca teuthidoides was first formally described in 1988 by Bryan Barlow and Kirsten Cowley in Australian Systematic Botany. The specific epithet (teuthidoides) is derived from the Ancient Greek words teuthis meaning "squid" and the suffix εἶδος (eîdos) meaning "likeness" referring to the sepals' resembling the arms of a squid.

Distribution and habitat
This melaleuca occurs in and between the Marvel Loch, Ravensthorpe and Balladonia districts in the Avon Wheatbelt, Coolgardie, Esperance Plains and Mallee biogeographic regions. The plants grow in sand or clay in depressions that fill with water after rain.

Conservation
Melaleuca teuthidoides is listed as "not threatened" by the Government of Western Australia Department of Parks and Wildlife.

References

teuthidoides
Myrtales of Australia
Plants described in 1988
Endemic flora of Western Australia